The Redwood Valley AVA is an American Viticultural Area located in Mendocino County, California.  The earliest vineyards were planted in the valley by Italian immigrants in the 19th century.  The valley sits at an elevation that is  higher than the surrounding area.  It is cooler in climate and requires a later harvest for grapes to achieve ripeness.

See also
Mendocino County wine

References

External links
 Redwood Valley: Mendocino County Wines

American Viticultural Areas
American Viticultural Areas of California
American Viticultural Areas of Mendocino County, California
Italian-American culture in California
1996 establishments in California